Henri Bienvenu Ntsama (born 5 July 1988) is a Cameroonian footballer who plays for French club FC Métropole Troyenne as a striker.

Career

CA Bizertin
Henri Bienvenu began his professional career in the 2006–07 season at Club Athlétique Bizertin in highest Tunisian League. The following season, he scored seven goals.

Espérance
In January 2008, Bienvenu moved to league rivals Espérance Sportive de Tunis. In the 2008–09 season, he completed 21 games for the club scoring 6 goals and won the Tunisian Ligue 1 with Espérance.Winning a North African Champions Cup, Tunisian National Cup. After the following season, during which he played 11 league games for the club, he left in January 2010.

Young Boys
In January 2010, Bienvenu joined Swiss club BSC Young Boys signing a contract until the summer of 2013. On 7 February, he made his debut for the club in the away game against FC Basel, being substituted on for fellow striker Matar Coly in the 72nd minute. Bienvenu played a total of 55 games in the Axpo Super League scoring 21 goals. Almost qualifying BSC Young Boys for champions league after scoring the winning goal against Fenerbaçe but unfortunately lost to Tottenham in London gave him a ticket to join Fenerbaçe.

Fenerbahçe
In September 2011, Bienvenu moved to Fenerbahçe in Turkey signing a four-year contract worth €4 million. The transfer fee paid was €4 million.

He ended a long-lasting scoring drought on 16 September 2011 scoring in 3–1 win against Gaziantepspor. After a difficult time in Fenerbahçe, he was loaned to Real Zaragoza in Spanish La Liga in January 2013. As the club failed to avoid relegation, he returned to Fenerbahçe.

Eskişehirspor
Bienvenu joined Eskişehirspor in Turkey, where he scored 10 goals in the Süper Lig and reached the final of the Turkish Cup, losing against Galatasaray.

Troyes
Bienvenu left Eskişehirspor during the summer, and signed for Troyes AC in September 2014. He scored his first goal for the club on 20 September 2014, in a 3–2 away defeat against Le Havre.

Career statistics

Notes

Honours

Clubs

Espérance Sportive de Tunis
Tunisian President Cup: 2008
Tunisian Ligue Professionnelle 1: 2008–2009
North African Cup: 2009
Arab Champions League: 2009

Fenerbahçe
Türkiye Kupası: 2011–12

Troyes
Ligue 2: 2014–15

References

External links

Henri Bienvenu at Eurosport.com

1988 births
Living people
Association football forwards
Cameroonian footballers
Cameroonian expatriate footballers
Coton Sport FC de Garoua players
CA Bizertin players
Espérance Sportive de Tunis players
BSC Young Boys players
Fenerbahçe S.K. footballers
Real Zaragoza players
Eskişehirspor footballers
ES Troyes AC players
Al Urooba Club players
Swiss Super League players
Süper Lig players
La Liga players
Ligue 2 players
Championnat National 2 players
Championnat National 3 players
UAE First Division League players
Expatriate footballers in Tunisia
Expatriate footballers in Switzerland
Expatriate footballers in Turkey
Expatriate footballers in Spain
Expatriate footballers in France
Expatriate footballers in the United Arab Emirates
Cameroonian expatriate sportspeople in Tunisia
Cameroonian expatriate sportspeople in Switzerland
Cameroonian expatriate sportspeople in Turkey
Cameroonian expatriate sportspeople in Spain
Cameroonian expatriate sportspeople in France
Cameroonian expatriate sportspeople in the United Arab Emirates
Cameroon international footballers